Raja Sir Savalai Ramaswami Mudaliar  (1840–1911) was an Indian merchant, dubash, politician and philanthropist who was known for his wealth. He was also one of the early leaders of the Indian National Congress.

Early life 

Ramaswami Mudaliar was born in 1840 to a building contractor in a Sengunthar family from Pondicherry. His father had been declared insolvent and moved to Madras in order to escape creditors. 

Ramaswami Mudaliar joined Dymes and Co. and soon rose to become its dubash, amassing a huge fortune.

Philanthropy 

Mudaliar was known for his philanthropic activities in Madras Presidency. He established various choultries  in memory of his first wife, Ranee Thyal Nayagi Ammal, as well as hospitals in Madras, Royapuram, Thirukazhgukundram, Cuddalore, and Kanchipuram.  He built a child-care hospital in Cuddalore which is presently being maintained by the municipality. 

In 1884, Mudaliar started a choultry near Chennai Central railway station. This Choultry survived till the 1960s, later taken over by AG &OT of Madras High Court. The charities remain active. The Women and Children hospital at Kozhikode was established in 1903 by Raja Sir Ramaswamy Mudaliar, in memory of Queen Victoria, and was handed over to the Government on 22 September 1903.

In 1902, Mudaliar was chosen to represent the city of Madras at the coronation of King Edward VII and Queen Alexandra scheduled for June that year. 

The coronation was postponed when the king fell ill, and Mudaliar returned to India in July, missing the rescheduled coronation the following month.

Indian Independence Movement 
Mudaliar was associated with the Indian National Union and was a part of its 1885 three-member delegation to England. He was also associated with the Indian National Congress in its early stages.

Mudaliar participated in the third session of the Indian National Congress held at Madras in 1887. He was a part of the welcoming committee. A resolution was moved demanding more representation for Indians in the administration. Mudaliar endorsed the resolution and spoke:

On the third day of the Madras session, Mudaliar moved an amendment suggesting that the question of establishing a Public Service Commission be postponed to the next session. 
Mudaliar also participated in the fifth session of the Indian National Congress held in 1889. He participated in subsequent sessions of the Indian National Congress. In the 1894 Congress, he proposed Alfred Webb for the presidency of the Congress and he was duly elected.

Death 

Mudaliar died in 1911 at the age of 71 and was buried at his private burial ground at Kilapuk Garden Road Kilpauk, Chennai. His statue was erected by his friends which is kept in the Choultry.

Legacy and honours 

Ramaswami Mudaliar was made a Companion of the Order (C.I.E) of the Indian Empire on 6 June 1885. He was also awarded the titles of "Rao Bahadur". In 1886, he became the 158th Sheriff of Madras, the first Indian to hold the post. He was knighted on 14 February 1887 in the Queen's Golden Jubilee Honours List. The title of 'Raja''' was conferred upon him as a personal distinction, i.e. it was not hereditary since he was a non-royal, by Her Most Gracious Majesty. It was conferred on 1 January 1891 at Fort William by Marquess of Lansdowne, Viceroy and Governor General of India'' 

Mudaliar's birthday is celebrated each year through a public function at his choultry opposite to Central Railway station . The function is organised by Ramaswamy Mudaliar charities which is managed by AGOT of Madras High Court and Co-Trustee S.V.R.Ramprasad, great grandson of Mudaliar.

Notes

References 

 
 

1840 births
1911 deaths
Companions of the Order of the Indian Empire
Knights Bachelor
Indian Knights Bachelor
Indian merchants
Indian National Congress politicians from Puducherry
Businesspeople from Puducherry
Sheriffs of Madras
19th-century Indian politicians
19th-century Indian businesspeople
20th-century Indian businesspeople
20th-century Indian politicians
Puducherry politicians